Finger-Tatuk Provincial Park is a provincial park in British Columbia, Canada. The lakes are known for rainbow trout and kokanee salmon, and each of the two larger lakes has a resort.

References

External links
Finger-Tatuk Provincial Park: Purpose Statement and Zoning Plan (March 2003)

Provincial parks of British Columbia
Regional District of Bulkley-Nechako
1999 establishments in British Columbia
Protected areas established in 1999